The National Democratic Party is a Bulgarian political party founded on March 25, 2012 from a split of Ataka.

The party has been led by Dimitar Stoyanov since June 2012.

Electoral results 
Until June 2014, it had an MEP, Dimitar Stoyanov, and is a member of the Alliance of European National Movements.

References

2012 establishments in Bulgaria
Nationalist parties in Bulgaria
Political parties established in 2012